A partial lunar eclipse took place on Saturday, May 3, 1958. This was the first partial lunar eclipse of Saros cycle 140. While technically a partial eclipse, the Moon barely clipped the Earth's umbral shadow, which may have been very difficult to observe in practice; though a shading across the moon from the Earth's penumbral shadow should have been visible at maximum eclipse. The partial eclipse lasted for 21 minutes exactly. 0.919% of the Moon was in umbral shadow on Saturday, 3 May 1958.

Visibility

Related lunar eclipses

Lunar year series

Half-Saros cycle
A lunar eclipse will be preceded and followed by solar eclipses by 9 years and 5.5 days (a half saros). This lunar eclipse is related to two partial solar eclipses of Solar Saros 147.

See also
List of 20th-century lunar eclipses
Lists of lunar eclipses

Notes

External links

1958-05
1958 in science
May 1958 events